Daniel Flottmann (born 6 August 1984) is a German footballer who plays for Regionalliga West club SV Rödinghausen.

References

External links

1984 births
Living people
German footballers
VfL Osnabrück players
SC Verl players
Rot Weiss Ahlen players
Wuppertaler SV players
SC Fortuna Köln players
SV Rödinghausen players
3. Liga players
Regionalliga players
Sportspeople from Osnabrück
Association football central defenders
Footballers from Lower Saxony
21st-century German people